Zegartowice  is a village in the administrative district of Gmina Papowo Biskupie, within Chełmno County, Kuyavian-Pomeranian Voivodeship, in north-central Poland.

The village has a population of 489.

There is a primary school in the village of Zegartowice.

Gallery

References

Zegartowice